Portones de Hierro y Campodónico is a populated rural area and suburb the city of Bella Unión in Artigas Department of northwestern Uruguay.

Geography
It borders the city to the northwest, the suburb Coronado to the west, and Brazil to the east, with Río Cuareim between them as the natural international border.

Population
In 2011 Portones de Hierro y Campodónico had a population of 323.
 
Source: Instituto Nacional de Estadística de Uruguay

References

External links
INE map of Bella Unión, Coronado, Las Piedras and Portones de Hierro y Campodónico

Populated places in the Artigas Department